In the geometry of hyperbolic 3-space, the order-4 square tiling honeycomb is one of 11 paracompact regular honeycombs. It is paracompact because it has infinite cells and vertex figures, with all vertices as ideal points at infinity. Given by Schläfli symbol {4,4,4}, it has four square tilings around each edge, and infinite square tilings around each vertex in a square tiling vertex figure.

Symmetry

Two more half symmetry constructions with pyramidal domains have [4,4,1+,4] symmetry:  ↔ , and  ↔ .

Images

The order-4 square tiling honeycomb is analogous to the 2D hyperbolic infinite-order apeirogonal tiling, {∞,∞}, with infinite apeirogonal faces, and with all vertices on the ideal surface.
 

It contains  and  that tile 2-hypercycle surfaces, which are similar to these paracompact order-4 apeirogonal tilings :

Related polytopes and honeycombs 
The order-4 square tiling honeycomb is a regular hyperbolic honeycomb in 3-space. It is one of eleven regular paracompact honeycombs. 

There are nine uniform honeycombs in the [4,4,4] Coxeter group family, including this regular form.

It is part of a sequence of honeycombs with a square tiling vertex figure:

It is part of a sequence of honeycombs with square tiling cells:

It is part of a sequence of quasiregular polychora and honeycombs:

Rectified order-4 square tiling honeycomb 

The rectified order-4 hexagonal tiling honeycomb,  t1{4,4,4},  has square tiling facets, with a cubic vertex figure. It is the same as the regular square tiling honeycomb, {4,4,3}, .

Truncated order-4 square tiling honeycomb 

The truncated order-4 square tiling honeycomb, t0,1{4,4,4},  has square tiling and truncated square tiling facets, with a square pyramid vertex figure.

Bitruncated order-4 square tiling honeycomb 

The bitruncated order-4 square tiling honeycomb, t1,2{4,4,4},  has truncated square tiling facets, with a tetragonal disphenoid vertex figure.

Cantellated order-4 square tiling honeycomb 

The cantellated order-4 square tiling honeycomb,  is the same thing as the rectified square tiling honeycomb, . It has cube and square tiling facets, with a triangular prism vertex figure.

Cantitruncated order-4 square tiling honeycomb 

The cantitruncated order-4 square tiling honeycomb,  is the same as the truncated square tiling honeycomb, . It contains cube and truncated square tiling facets, with a mirrored sphenoid vertex figure.

It is the same as the truncated square tiling honeycomb, .

Runcinated order-4 square tiling honeycomb 

The runcinated order-4 square tiling honeycomb, t0,3{4,4,4},  has square tiling and cube facets, with a square antiprism vertex figure.

Runcitruncated order-4 square tiling honeycomb 

The runcitruncated order-4 square tiling honeycomb, t0,1,3{4,4,4},  has square tiling, truncated square tiling, cube, and octagonal prism facets, with a square pyramid vertex figure.

The runcicantellated order-4 square tiling honeycomb is equivalent to the runcitruncated order-4 square tiling honeycomb.

Omnitruncated order-4 square tiling honeycomb 

The omnitruncated order-4 square tiling honeycomb, t0,1,2,3{4,4,4},  has truncated square tiling and octagonal prism facets, with a digonal disphenoid vertex figure.

Alternated order-4 square tiling honeycomb 

The alternated order-4 square tiling honeycomb is a lower-symmetry construction of the order-4 square tiling honeycomb itself.

Cantic order-4 square tiling honeycomb 

The cantic order-4 square tiling honeycomb is a lower-symmetry construction of the truncated order-4 square tiling honeycomb.

Runcic order-4 square tiling honeycomb 

The runcic order-4 square tiling honeycomb is a lower-symmetry construction of the order-3 square tiling honeycomb.

Runcicantic order-4 square tiling honeycomb 

The runcicantic order-4 square tiling honeycomb is a lower-symmetry construction of the bitruncated order-4 square tiling honeycomb.

Quarter order-4 square tiling honeycomb

See also 
 Convex uniform honeycombs in hyperbolic space
 Regular tessellations of hyperbolic 3-space
 Paracompact uniform honeycombs

References 

Coxeter, Regular Polytopes, 3rd. ed., Dover Publications, 1973. . (Tables I and II: Regular polytopes and honeycombs, pp. 294–296)
 The Beauty of Geometry: Twelve Essays (1999), Dover Publications,  (Chapter 10, Regular Honeycombs in Hyperbolic Space) Table III
 Jeffrey R. Weeks The Shape of Space, 2nd edition  (Chapter 16-17: Geometries on Three-manifolds I,II)
 Norman Johnson Uniform Polytopes, Manuscript
 N.W. Johnson: The Theory of Uniform Polytopes and Honeycombs, Ph.D. Dissertation, University of Toronto, 1966 
 N.W. Johnson: Geometries and Transformations, (2018) Chapter 13: Hyperbolic Coxeter groups
 Norman W. Johnson and Asia Ivic Weiss Quadratic Integers and Coxeter Groups PDF Can. J. Math. Vol. 51 (6), 1999 pp. 1307–1336

Honeycombs (geometry)
Self-dual tilings
Square tilings